Aberdeen is a 2000 Norwegian-British drama film directed by Hans Petter Moland and starring Stellan Skarsgård, Lena Headey and Charlotte Rampling.

Synopsis
Lawyer Kaisa Heller, just promoted, has no apparent emotional attachments, preferring nameless encounters with men. She is surprised to receive a call from Helen, her dying mother, with a final request to bring Kaisa's estranged father Tomas to see her at the hospital. The film is a bit of a road movie with encounters along the way, some confrontational, such as boozing louts who harass her father or angry stewardesses issuing ultimatums, while some are romantic, such as truck driver Clive whom Kaisa attempts to use, but instead finds herself attached to. What started as an unavoidable chore, perhaps the last she will have never been able to dodge, becomes a new starting point in her life.

Cast
Stellan Skarsgård - Tomas Heller
Jean Anderson - Young Kaisa
Lena Headey - Kairo 'Kaisa' Heller
Charlotte Rampling - Helen
Ian Hart - Clive
Louise Goodall - Sara
Jason Hetherington - Perkins
Kate Lynn Evans - Emily
John Killoran - Blake
Fergis McLarnon - Eric
Anders T. Andersen - Customs Official
Nina Andresen Borud - Flight Attendant
Henriette Steenstrup - Car Rental Clerk
Kari Simonsen - Waitress
J.J. Mckeown - Boy at door
Jan Grønli - Granbakken
Gard Eidsvold - Disagreeable Man

References

External links
 
 
 

2000 films
2000 drama films
2000s English-language films
English-language Norwegian films
English-language Swedish films
Films directed by Hans Petter Moland
Films shot in Sweden
Swedish drama films
British drama films
2000s legal films
Films shot in Norway
Films shot in Scotland
Films about lawyers
Films about dysfunctional families
Films scored by Zbigniew Preisner
Norwegian drama films
2000s British films
2000s Swedish films